Department of Children and Family Services (DSS or DFCS) is a state agency of Louisiana. It deals with child welfare, adoption, and family services.

It replaced the former Department of Social Services (DSS).

References

External links
 Department of Children and Family Services

Child abuse in the United States
Child welfare in the United States
State agencies of Louisiana